Biff Howard Tannen is a fictional character and a major antagonist in the Back to the Future trilogy. Thomas F. Wilson plays Biff in all three films as well as the Universal Studios ride, and voiced the character in the animated series. Biff is the main antagonist of the first and second films. Biff's great-grandfather, Buford "Mad Dog" Tannen, is the main antagonist of the third.

The character is portrayed as a large, belligerent, dim-witted bully who obtains what he wants by intimidating others into doing his work for him, or by cheating. He and his family members are shown to misuse idioms in ways that make them appear foolish and comical, despite their intention to insult or intimidate. He frequently calls others "butthead".

Character portrayal

Biff's early life and nature 
Biff was born in Hill Valley, California. He is the great-grandson of Buford "Mad Dog" Tannen, son of Irving "Kid" Tannen and grandfather of Griff Tannen. He bullied George McFly into doing his homework for him while he drank and hung out with his friends. Feared by most of his schoolmates, he was less brave without his gang (Match, Skinhead, and 3-D). The only person at Hill Valley High School that Biff fears is Mr. Strickland. Biff lives with his grandmother, Gertrude Tannen, at 1809 Mason Street. In 1955, Biff proudly owned a black 1946 Ford Deluxe convertible which he drove around Hill Valley.  He has a particular dislike for manure, displayed when he is shoved into large quantities of it at multiple points during the films.

Biff's relationships 
In 1955, Biff coveted Lorraine Baines who did not return the sentiments. In the original 1985, Biff's marital status is unknown as no mention of a wife was ever made in the trilogy.

The alternate 1985 reveals that Lorraine, widowed after the murder of George McFly, ended up marrying Biff in 1973 so that her children could live a better life. In a video clip after their wedding, Biff is asked, "how does it feel?", to which he replies, "third time's the charm".

Biff's children 
By 2015, Biff has a teenage grandson, Griff, suggesting that Biff had at least one child by 1985. The animated series reveals that Biff has a son, Biff Jr.

Character creation 
The character is named for studio executive Ned Tanen following an incident years earlier where Tanen reacted aggressively to a script being pitched by the film's writers Bob Gale and Robert Zemeckis. Tanen accused the two of attempting to produce an antisemitic work with their 1978 film, I Wanna Hold Your Hand. Drafts of Back to the Future show the character with the middle initial of "H", but this detail was omitted in further revisions. 

As the October 2015 date featured in the films approached, media outlets began noting the similarities between the older version of the character and Donald Trump, who at the time Part II was produced had just purchased the Plaza Hotel in New York City and, by 2015, was in the midst of an ultimately successful run for President of the United States. When the comparison was brought to Gale's attention in an interview, he said, "Yeah. That's what we were thinking about". Both The Daily Beast and Rolling Stone note the similarities of Biff's casino penthouse to Trump Plaza Hotel and Casino; additionally, The Beast points out that in Back to the Future Part II:Biff uses the profits from his 27-story casino... to help shake up the Republican Party, before eventually assuming political power himself, helping transform Hill Valley, California, into a lawless, dystopian wasteland, where hooliganism reigns, dissent is quashed, and wherein Biff encourages every citizen to call him "America's greatest living folk hero".

The fact checking website Snopes, however, doubts this claim, noting that neither Gale nor Zemeckis mentioned anything about Trump being the inspiration for the character until after comparisons began appearing in social media, and saying that it "...appeared to be retrofitted to 2015's current events, not prescience on the part of the filmmakers in 1985".

References

External links 
 Biff Tannen on IMDb

Back to the Future (franchise)
Comedy film characters
Fictional alcohol abusers
Fictional bullies
Fictional businesspeople
Fictional characters from California
Fictional domestic abusers
Fictional gamblers
Fictional murderers
Film characters introduced in 1985
Male film villains
Parodies of Donald Trump
Science fiction film characters
Teenage characters in film
Time travelers